The following lists events that happened during 1983 in the United Arab Emirates.

Incumbents
President: Zayed bin Sultan Al Nahyan 
Prime Minister: Rashid bin Saeed Al Maktoum

Events

September
 September 23 1983- A bomb explodes on Gulf Air Flight 771, killing all 112 people on board.

References

 
Years of the 20th century in the United Arab Emirates
United Arab Emirates
United Arab Emirates
1980s in the United Arab Emirates